The San Vitores Beach Japanese Fortification are the remains of World War II-era defensive positions facing the beach of Tumon Bay on the west side of the island of Guam. Located near the stairs to the beach of the Guam Reef Hotel are the remains of two concrete pillboxes built by Japanese defenders during the occupation period 1941–44.

The defenses were listed on the National Register of Historic Places in 1991. The beach is named after Diego Luis de San Vitores, who was martyred in Tumon Bay.

See also
National Register of Historic Places listings in Guam

References

Buildings and structures on the National Register of Historic Places in Guam
World War II on the National Register of Historic Places in Guam
1940s establishments in Guam
Tumon, Guam
Beaches of Guam